The Matres (Latin for "mothers") and Matronae (Latin for "matrons") were female deities venerated in Northwestern Europe, of whom relics are found dating from the first to the fifth century AD. They are depicted on votive offerings and altars that bear images of goddesses, depicted almost entirely in groups of three, that feature inscriptions (about half of which feature Continental Celtic names and half of which feature Germanic names) and were venerated in regions of Germania, Eastern Gaul, and Northern Italy (with a small distribution elsewhere) that were occupied by the Roman army from the first to the fifth century.

Matres also appear on votive reliefs and inscriptions in other areas occupied by the Roman army, including southeast Gaul, as at Vertillum; in Spain and Portugal, where some twenty inscriptions are known, among them several ones that include local epithets such as a dedication to the Matribus Gallaicis "to the Galician Mothers"; and also in the Romano-Celtic culture of Pannonia in the form of similar reliefs and inscriptions to the Nutrices Augustae, "the august Nurses" found in Roman sites of Ptuj, Lower Styria.

Motifs 

Matres and Matronae appear depicted on both stones with inscriptions and without, both as altars and votives. All depictions are frontal, they appear almost exclusively in threes with at least one figure holding a basket of fruit in her lap, and the women are either standing or sitting. In some depictions, the middle figure is depicted with loose hair and wearing a headband, and the other two wear head dresses.  In addition, snakes, children, and nappies (diapers) appear.  Other motifs include depictions of sacrifice—including burning incense, pigs, bowls filled with fruit—and decorations of fruits, plants, and trees.  In most cases, the votive stones and altars are not found singularly, but rather in groups around temple buildings and cult centers.

Function 

The motif of triple goddesses was widespread in ancient Europe; compare the Fates (including Moirai, Parcae, and Norns), the Erinyes, the Charites, the Morrígan, the Horae, and other such figures, including the Tridevi of Hinduism.

Rudolf Simek suggests that the loose hair may point to maidenhood, whereas the head dresses may refer to married women, the snakes may refer to an association with the souls of the dead or the underworld, and the children and nappies seem to suggest that the Matres and Matronae held a protective function over the family, as well as a particular function as midwives.

Veneration 

Information about the religious practices surrounding the Matres is limited to the stones on which their depictions and inscriptions are found, of which more than 1,100 exist.

Motifs include depictions of sacrifice—including burning incense, pigs, bowls filled with fruit—and decorations of fruits, plants, and trees.  In most cases, the votive stones and altars are not found singularly, but rather in groups around temple buildings and cult centers.

See also 
 Matrika
 Dea Matrona
 Modron
 Mōdraniht
 Nehalennia
 Suleviae

Notes

References

Further reading
 
 Spickermann, Wolfgang. "NOUVELLES RÉFLEXIONS RELATIVES À LA GENÈSE ET AUXVECTEURS DU CULTE MATRONAL DANS LA RÉGION DU RHIN INFÉRIEUR." Cahiers Du Centre Gustave Glotz 13 (2002): 141-67.  www.jstor.org/stable/24359212.

Agricultural goddesses
Celtic goddesses
Death goddesses
Earth goddesses
Fertility goddesses
Germanic goddesses
Deities of classical antiquity
Mother goddesses
Triple goddesses
Gaulish goddesses